Ontuxizumab is a humanized rabbit monoclonal antibody designed for the treatment of cancer. It binds to endosialin (TEM1 or CD248).

Phase I trials are complete and the drug was granted orphan drug status by the FDA for sarcoma. It is currently in phase II trials for melanoma, colorectal cancer, sarcoma, and lymphoma.

This drug was developed by Morphotek and Ludwig Institute for Cancer Research.

References 

Monoclonal antibodies
Experimental cancer drugs